Venturi Racing (formerly Venturi Formula E Team) was a Monegasque motor racing team controlled by Scott Swid (Chairman and principal owner) and José M Aznar Botella. The team competed in the FIA Formula E World Championship. Venturi Racing competed with a single-make chassis built by Spark and initially built its own powertrains, before partnering with Mercedes from the 2019–20 season. The team was renamed to Maserati MSG Racing from the 2022–23 season.

History

2014–15 season
Venturi was founded by Gildo Pallanca Pastor and became one of Formula E's founding teams by committing to the championship in December 2013. For the series' inaugural season, it was announced that the team had signed Nick Heidfeld and Stéphane Sarrazin as its drivers, with Franck Baldet as team coordinator.

In Formula E's debut race at the Beijing ePrix, Heidfeld was running in second place and attempted to overtake Nicolas Prost for the lead on the final lap. In the last corner, the pair collided and both failed to finish, with the accident causing Heidfeld's car to alarmingly fly through the air and land on the roll hoop. This handed the win to Lucas di Grassi. Prost was given a 10-place grid penalty for the next round in Putrajaya.

At the Buenos Aires ePrix, Venturi was again in contention for victory with Heidfeld. With three laps to go, Heidfeld received a drive-through penalty for speeding in the pit lane. This handed António Félix da Costa his maiden Formula E victory.

Venturi took its largest points haul of the season at the Berlin ePrix. Heidfeld took the team's only podium finish of the season at the Moscow ePrix, taking third behind eventual champion Nelson Piquet Jr. and di Grassi.

Sarrazin won the final race of the season from pole position but was penalised for exceeding the maximum energy usage, dropping him to 15th. Heidfeld ended the season in 12th position in the Drivers' Championship with 31 points while Sarrazin was 14th on 22 points, leaving the team ninth in the standings. Heidfeld left the team at the end of the season to join Mahindra.

2015–16 season
For the 2015-16 season, Venturi supplied powertrains to customer team Dragon Racing and signed 1997 Formula One World Champion Jacques Villeneuve as a teammate to Sarrazin. After the Punta del Este ePrix, however, the Canadian left after 'disagreeing on the direction of the team'. He was replaced by Mike Conway.

Sarrazin outperformed both drivers over the season, scoring points at every race and finishing second behind di Grassi in Long Beach, which was also the scene of Conway's first points finish of the season in 10th place.

Venturi finished in sixth position in the Teams’ Championship with 77 points. Sarrazin claimed 70 of these to also rank sixth in the Drivers’ Standings while Conway claimed the remaining seven points to rank 16th. Villeneuve ranked 20th with zero points.

With a run of 10 points-scoring races, Sarrazin became the first driver in Formula E to record points at every round in one season.

2016–17 season
Sarrazin was retained for a third consecutive season by Venturi and was partnered by FIA GT World Cup driver Maro Engel who replaced Conway at the team.

Venturi commenced the campaign with a double points finish at the 2016 Hong Kong ePrix, however, an uncompetitive car resulted in a difficult season. The team's best result came in Monaco, where Engel recorded fifth position.

For the 2017 Paris ePrix, Formula V8 3.5 Series champion Tom Dillmann filled in for Engel who was racing in the 2017 Deutsche Tourenwagen Masters round at the EuroSpeedway Lausitz. One race later in Berlin, Dillmann replaced Sarrazin who moved to Techeetah to replace Esteban Gutiérrez for the final six races.

Venturi recorded 30 points to finish ninth in the Teams’ Championship. Engel recorded 16 of these points to take 17th in the Drivers’ Standings while Dillmann recorded 12 for 19th and Sarrazin, 2.

2017–18 season
For the fourth season of Formula E, Venturi re-signed Engel and hired seven time Macau World Cup winner Edoardo Mortara.

On his debut weekend in Formula E in Hong Kong, Mortara claimed the team's first podium since the 2016 Long Beach ePrix. The Swiss-Italian driver led for most of the race, however, span out of first position with three laps to go when trying to set the fastest lap. Mortara finished third but was promoted to second following the disqualification of race winner Daniel Abt.

Due to commitments in the DTM championship with Mercedes, Dillmann filled in for Mortara at the Berlin and New York City races.

Mortara's podium in the season-opener marked Venturi's highest finish in Formula E's fourth season in which the team recorded 72 points to rank seventh in the Teams’ Championship. Engel finished 12th in the Drivers’ Standings with 31 points while Mortara was 13th with 29. Dillmann notched 12 points in his three race appearances to finish 18th.

2018–19 season
In May 2018, Venturi signed a three-year deal with 11-time Formula One race winner Felipe Massa and rehired Mortara for a second season. Norman Nato was named as the team's Reserve Driver. Former professional racing driver Susie Wolff became the Team Principal while Franck Baldet became Technical Director.

Venturi supplied powertrains to the Mercedes-affiliated HWA Racelab team over the 2018–19 season, with the outfit preparing for the official entry of the Mercedes-Benz EQ Formula E Team in the 2019-20 season.

At Formula E's landmark 50th race at the 2019 Hong Kong ePrix, Mortara recorded Venturi's maiden victory.

Venturi took further podiums at the Mexico City E-Prix and Monaco E-Prix which was also the site of Massa's first podium finish in Formula E. With 88 points, the team took eighth in the championship. Mortara finished 14th in the Drivers’ Standings with 52 points while Massa was 15th with 36 points.

2019–20 season
In October 2019, Venturi confirmed that Mortara would again partner Massa while the team entered a powertrain partnership with Mercedes-Benz.

On the eve of the 2019-20 season opener, the team announced a three-year title sponsorship with telecommunications company ROKiT, and also confirmed the retention of Norman Nato as reserve driver and the appointment of Arthur Leclerc, brother of Ferrari Formula One driver Charles Leclerc, as test driver.

The team recorded five consecutive points finishes in the first five races, prior to the season's five-month suspension as a result of the COVID-19 pandemic.

After the season resumed in August with six races at the Tempelhof Airport Street Circuit in Berlin, Mortara took 14th in the Drivers' Championship with 41 points while Massa was 22nd with 3 points. Venturi finished in 10th in the Teams' Standings with 44 points. At the final race of the season, it was announced that Massa would be retiring from Formula E.

2020–21 season
For Formula E's seventh season and first as a World Championship, Venturi re-signed Mortara and promoted Norman Nato to a full-time race seat, with the Frenchman replacing Massa. Jake Hughes, in turn, joined the team as Reserve Driver while Jérôme d'Ambrosio was appointed as Deputy Team Principal after deciding to retire from professional competition at the end of Season 6.

In December 2020, Venturi announced a take over in ownership, with a US investor group led by Scott Swid and Jose M Aznar Botella purchasing the team. Susie Wolff remained as Team Principal and retained an interest in Venturi alongside Founder Gildo Pallanca Pastor.

Mortara commenced the season with a podium at the 2021 Diriyah ePrix in which he secured second place behind Nyck de Vries. One day later, the Swiss-Italian driver was involved in a high-speed frontal collision during practice for Race 2 when an incorrect software parameter caused a brake failure. Although Mortara was released from hospital, he did not take part in the second leg of the season opener.

Mortara returned to the cockpit one race later in Rome and scored a further three podiums over the remainder of the season, including a second career victory at the inaugural Puebla ePrix – Venturi’s first win since the Season 5 Hong Kong ePrix, 834 days earlier.

Amassing 92 points, Mortara was a key championship protagonist in the season’s finale in Berlin, however, was removed from contention following a collision with Mitch Evans on the opening lap of the final race of the year in which he sustained a microfracture of his fourth vertebra.

Mercedes’ de Vries went on to win the Season 7 championship while Mortara became Formula E’s first vice-World Champion by claiming second place in the Drivers’ Standings.

In his rookie campaign, Nato steadily improved and won the final race of the season in Berlin, standing on the Formula E podium for the first time after being stripped of a second and third-placed finish in Valencia and Rome. With this result, and outside of Formula E's inaugural campaign, Nato became only the third driver to win a race in their rookie season. The Frenchman ended the season as Venturi’s most successful rookie on record, amassing 54 points and finishing 18th in the Drivers’ Championship.

Venturi finished in seventh position in the Teams’ Standings with 146 points, completing its most successful season in Formula E to date in terms of points scored.

2021–22 season
In September 2021, Venturi re-signed Mortara for a fifth successive season while Season 3 champion Lucas di Grassi joined the team, replacing Nato who, in turn, joined Jaguar Racing as Reserve Driver. Susie Wolff, meanwhile, was promoted to the position of CEO while Jérôme D'Ambrosio took over as Team Principal.

In Race Two of the 2022 Diriyah ePrix, Venturi scored its first double podium in Formula E, with Mortara taking his third victory while di Grassi secured his first podium for the team. Mortara later secured his first Formula E pole position at the 2022 Berlin ePrix – a result that marked Venturi Racing's first pole position since the 2015 London ePrix, 2,512 days earlier.

Mortara went on to win Race 1 in Berlin to commence a four-race podium run, taking second in Race 2 in Berlin, third in Jakarta and winning in Marrakesh. This stint ended in New York, although di Grassi returned to the podium by finishing third in Race 1. Di Grassi secured his 13th Formula E win at the 2022 London ePrix one weekend later.

Di Grassi became the first driver in Formula E to score his 1,000th point in the series in Race One of the 2022 Seoul ePrix. Mortara secured his fourth win of the season in the final race, which also marked Formula E's landmark 100th race.

As a result, Venturi completed its most successful season to date, amassing 295 points to finish second in the World Teams' Championship behind Mercedes-EQ. Mortara finished third in the World Drivers' Championship with 169 points while di Grassi was fifth with 129 points.

At the close of the season, Venturi confirmed the departure of Wolff and D'Ambrosio from its senior management team, ahead of its transition to Maserati MSG Racing in Season 9.

Partners

Next Gen Programme
In March 2018, Venturi became the first Formula E team to establish a junior programme. There were eight drivers in the programme:

Results

Notes
  – In the inaugural season, all teams were supplied with a spec powertrain by McLaren.
  – Driver was fastest in group qualifying stage and was given one championship point.
 † – Driver did not finish the race, but was classified as he completed over 90% of the race distance.
 P– Marks the driver who was given three points for being starting on Pole.
 F– Marks the driver who was given one point for fastest lap.

Other teams supplied by Venturi

Notes

References

External links

 

Formula E teams
Monegasque auto racing teams
Auto racing teams established in 2013